Eisenhower is a surname derived from the German word , meaning "iron hewer". People with the surname include:

Anne Eisenhower (born 1949), prominent interior designer, daughter of John Eisenhower
David Eisenhower (born 1948), historian, son of John Eisenhower
David Jacob Eisenhower (1863–1942), father of President Dwight D. Eisenhower
Doud Eisenhower (1917–1921), first son of President Dwight D. Eisenhower
Dwight D. Eisenhower (1890–1969), five-star general and 34th president of the United States
Earl D. Eisenhower (1898–1968), American electrical engineer and politician, brother of President Dwight D. Eisenhower
Edgar N. Eisenhower (1889–1971), American lawyer, brother of President Dwight D. Eisenhower
Ida Stover Eisenhower (1862–1946), mother of President Dwight D. Eisenhower
Jennie Eisenhower (born 1978), actress, daughter of David and Julie Eisenhower
John Eisenhower (1922–2013), U.S. Army officer, second son of President Dwight D. Eisenhower and Mamie Eisenhower
Julie Nixon Eisenhower (born 1948), daughter of Richard Nixon and wife of David Eisenhower
Mamie Eisenhower (1896–1979), wife of President Dwight D. Eisenhower
Mary Jean Eisenhower (born 1955), international charity worker, daughter of John Eisenhower
Milton S. Eisenhower (1899–1985), American University President, brother of President Dwight D. Eisenhower
Susan Eisenhower (born 1951), author and expert on international security, daughter of John Eisenhower

See also
USS Dwight D. Eisenhower, a warship named after President Eisenhower
W. Stine Isenhower (1927-2022), American politician
Eisenhauer
Isenhour

References

Americanized surnames
Swiss-language surnames
German-language surnames
Occupational surnames